Zovencedo is a town in the province of Vicenza, Veneto, north-eastern Italy. It is west of SP247 provincial road.

References

External links
 (Google Maps)

Cities and towns in Veneto